The 2008 Missouri Valley Conference men's basketball tournament was played in St. Louis, Missouri at the conclusion of the 2007–2008 regular season.

Tournament Bracket

See also
 Missouri Valley Conference

References

-2008 Missouri Valley Conference Menand#39;s Basketball Tournament
Missouri Valley Conference men's basketball tournament
Missouri Valley Conference Men's Basketball